Kutliyarovo (Qotloyar) is a rural locality (a village) in Vanyshevsky Selsoviet, Burayevsky District, Bashkortostan, Russia. The population was 65 as of 2010. There is 1 street.

Geography 
Bolsheshukshanovo is the nearest rural locality.

References 

Rural localities in Burayevsky District